Howard W. Clarke (1929–2015) was an American classicist. He was latterly Professor of Classics and Comparative Literature at the University of California, Santa Barbara (UCSB).

Education and career
Clarke graduated from Holy Cross College A.B. (1950) and Harvard University MA (1951); PhD (1960). He was a Teaching Fellow at Harvard (1950–51), a sergeant in the Army Security Agency in Berlin (1953–56), Instructor in Classics, Boston University (1956–1958, 1959–1960); Assistant to Full Professor of Classics at Oakland University, Rochester, Michigan, (1960–1969); and Professor of Classics and Comparative Literature UCSB (1969–1991).

From 1993 he worked as a destination lecturer on cruise ships in the Mediterranean.

He died on 24 January 2015 following a brief illness.

Bibliography
Clarke was the author of The Gospel of Matthew and Its Readers: A Historical Introduction to the First Gospel (Bloomington, Ind. : Indiana University Press, c2003). He has also authored The Art of the Odyssey (Prentice-Hall, 1967; rpt. Duckworth, 19940); Homer's Readers: A Historical Introduction to the Iliad and the Odyssey (University of Delaware Press, 1981), he has translated from the Polish The Return of Odysseus by Stanisław Wyspiański (Indiana University Press, 1966); and he has edited Twentieth Century Interpretations of the Odyssey (Prentice-Hall, 1983) and Vergil's Aeneid in the Dryden Translation (Penn State Press, 1987).

References

University of California, Santa Barbara faculty
American classical scholars
College of the Holy Cross alumni
Harvard University alumni
Classical scholars of Boston University
Oakland University faculty
1929 births
2015 deaths